The 2014 Southend-on-Sea Borough Council election took place on 22 May 2014 to elect members of Southend-on-Sea Borough Council in England. This was on the same day as other local elections.

After the election, the composition of the council was
Conservative 19
Independent 13
Labour 9
UKIP 5
Liberal Democrat 5

Results summary

Ward results

Belfairs

Blenheim Park

Chalkwell

Eastwood Park

Kursaal

Leigh

Milton

Prittlewell

St. Laurence

St. Luke's

Shoeburyness

Southchurch

Thorpe

Victoria

West Leigh

West Shoebury

Westborough

References

2014 English local elections
2014
2010s in Essex